OneShot is an adventure game developed by indie studio Future Cat and published by Degica. Based on a 2014 free version, it was released for Steam on December 8, 2016, and on itch.io on March 12, 2020. A version adapted for consoles, OneShot: World Machine Edition, was released for Nintendo Switch, PlayStation 4, and Xbox One on September 22, 2022.

Officially described as a game where "the world knows you exist", both its gameplay and plot involve metafictional elements. Many puzzles involve interacting with the operating system outside of the game application. Narratively, the player is a separate character from the protagonist Niko. The latter arrive in an unfamiliar world which has been deprived of its sunlight, and eventually aim to restore it by replacing its sun, a lightbulb, at the top of a tower.

OneShot received largely positive reviews, with most reviewers praising its narrative and metafictional aspects, comparing it positively to other games such as Undertale. In 2017, the game was nominated for the "PC Game of the Year" Golden Joystick Award.

Gameplay 

In OneShot, the player controls the child Niko, who is placed into an unfamiliar sunless world. The game exclusively shows Niko's viewpoint, employing a top-down perspective, while the player is a separate character, referred to by the user account they are signed into. Throughout the game, Niko can rest, causing the program to close; upon reopening, a short dream sequence is played.

As is typical for many adventure games, gameplay is primarily composed of solving puzzles involving items; the game lacks a combat system. Items can either be used to interact with a specific location, or combined to form a new item. Throughout the game, the player encounters computers, which signal that the player has to find content outside the game, including in the file system. These can also lead to interacting with the player's operating system in other ways, which includes moving the game window off-screen and back to mimic developing film, or by gaining clues from the desktop wallpaper. Due to these concepts, the in-game instructions recommend playing in windowed mode. The version for consoles, titled OneShot: World Machine Edition, uses a simulated operating system to allow players to interact with the game like they would with a computer.

Plot 
The game begins with Niko, a catlike child, who awakes in a dark and unfamiliar house. They interact with a computer, which addresses the player by a name derived from the computer's login name via an external dialog box. According to the machine, the world that Niko currently is in is near ruin, and the player's goal is to guide them back to their homeworld. They discover the world's sun, which is the form of a lightbulb, and use it to exit the house, emerging in a barren wasteland.

There they encounter a robot, which tells them that they are prophesied to save the world. Niko's goal is to carry the sun through its three areas, and place it at the apex of a central tower, restoring daylight; they are currently in the "Barrens". The robot teaches Niko to communicate with the player, telling Niko that the player is a god of the game's world whose responsibility is to guide the "Messiah" Niko. Niko meets Silver, a more sentient "tamed" robot, who gifts them a piece of amber that Niko uses as a guide to the next area.

Now in the arboreal "Glen", Niko converses with the area's residents, including the younger child Alula and older child Calamus, as well as the nature spirit Maize. After gathering materials and creating a feather pen to get past a guard robot, they then enter the urbanized third area, the "Refuge", and travel down to the city's surface with the aid of a lamplighter. Arriving at the library, they are directed to the librarian George, and get her attention with the help of researcher Kip Silverpoint. After some study, George translates a book of Niko's, a journal previously obtained back from the Barrens. It states that the tower, which is controlled by an "entity", can be accessed using three phosphoric items. This "entity" is the same voice that interacted with the player at the beginning of the game, and has limited control of the world. Niko has two such items on hand, and George gifts them the final one.

Niko arrives at the tower, but the player is unable to speak to them anymore. The entity informs Niko that both they and the player have won, and that they will return home now. Niko sees this as anticlimactic, but complies. The player finds a mysterious note has appeared as their new desktop wallpaper, telling them how to reconnect with Niko, and the player reappears, guiding them to the top. Discovering notes made by a mysterious figure termed "the Author", they learn that the entity has grown out of control and became destructive. Once at the top, the Author informs them that they can either break the sun and return Niko home, which would destroy the world, or place the sun at the top of the tower, trapping Niko in this world. Niko leaves the decision up to the player, forming the game's endings. If the player chooses to place the sun on the top of the tower, the world is depicted as now having brightness as a number of characters look up at their new sun in the credits. If the player chooses to destroy the sun, Niko returns home and states that they hear a voice from outside the game's window before saying goodbye and walking offscreen. The world is also depicted as having gone monochrome with purple outlines and black backgrounds and the fate of the world characters is unknown though they are implied to be gone.

"Solstice" path 
After the completion of the game, a note appears in the user's Documents folder, allowing the player to continue via the alternate "Solstice" ending path. Initially, it is identical to the main game, aside from Niko early possessing the Author's journal from the Barrens. When Niko meets Silver in the Barrens and enter the mines, they travel to an observation room instead, and meet Proto, a more advanced prototype of the prophet robot. Proto reminds Niko of the events of the original story line, which took place before this repeat. According to them, the world is a simulation, termed the "World Machine"; this new run is a reset of the machine.

Niko, Silver, and Proto travel to the Glen, but the latter two are crushed by a rockfall, but not before Proto gives Niko their backup memory disk. There, Niko meets Calamus and Alula again, and repairs the local mechanic Cedric's plane. Cedric says that his father was the Author, who created the World Machine to replace the previous world after its destruction. Niko and Cedric take his plane to the Refuge, and Cedric uses the backup memory disk to restore Proto, instructing Niko to find Rue, a sentient fox. Rue reveals that the World Machine is the original game's entity, and Niko's presence in the world corrupted it. Cedric and a restored Proto reappear, and alongside Niko, they enter the internals of the world machine, "taming" it and reversing its destructive behavior. Niko places the sun at the Tower and restores the world, reverting the deaths of characters, and Niko returns home. After reopening the game, the World Machine explains that without Niko, the player has no way to connect with the world, and gives an option to replay the game using Niko's recorded memories, allowing subsequent playthroughs of the game, with Niko represented by the World Machine's reflection of them.

Development 
The game started as freeware; this version was made in a month, and released online on June 30, 2014, by creators Eliza Velasquez and Casey Gu. It was developed as an entry for RPGMakerWeb's 2014 Indie Game Maker Contest, but did not receive any accolades. Unlike the Steam release, this initial version disallowed any further attempts at the game after a single playthrough, and terminated any progress if the player closed the main window outside of save points, hence the game's title. This concept was cut as the developers deemed it too harsh for a paid, full-length product.

According to Gu, OneShot was designed with an all-encompassing "dark but vibrant" theme to reflect the lack of sunlight in the setting. The areas of its world were inspired by the RGB colour model, and music for each area was only composed after its respective visual design was completed. Gu and Velasquez cited several thematic inspirations for the original game, including Hyper Light Drifter, The Legend of Zelda: Link's Awakening, and The Little Prince.

In an interview with PC Gamer, Velasquez said that the fourth-wall-breaking nature of OneShot was inspired by Psycho Mantis from Metal Gear Solid. She stated that this concept of a "meta game" came first, with the game's story being based on it. Although the initial version was released before Undertale; she described it as an "anti-influence", in that she wanted to do a unique take on the format after it came out. After the developers had run out of ideas, some more conventional puzzles were included in the game; for instance, the element of combining items was inspired by classic adventure games such as The Secret of Monkey Island.

After being featured at GDC and IndieCade, the previous version's "rerelease" was made available on Steam two years later, on December 8, 2016. On March 28, 2017, a new ending that solved some mysteries about the story was released; termed "Solstice", it was partially based on old sequel ideas for the game. The game's Mac version was launched on May 31, 2018, with gameplay intended to be "as close to the Windows version as possible", and a Linux version was released on April 24, 2019. Both the Linux and the Windows versions were later released on itch.io on March 12, 2020.

On December 8, 2021, the game's 5th anniversary, the developers announced that they were working on release for Nintendo Switch, PlayStation 4, and Xbox One incorporating "new features designed for consoles". On May 11, 2022, the version for Nintendo Switch was revealed as part of Nintendo's Indie World, under the title OneShot: World Machine Edition. Versions for all three consoles were released on September 22, 2022.

Reception 

The full version of OneShot received "generally favorable" reviews for Windows according to review aggregator Metacritic; while the Nintendo Switch World Machine version received "universal acclaim". Rock Paper Shotgun writer John Walker said that it was "completely charming, delightfully written, and extremely clever", and Louis Stowe of COGConnected described it as "a completely unexpected wonder". Charlie Nicholson of New Game Network compared it positively to Undertale and Pony Island, but said that it wasn't "revolutionary".

Multiple reviewers commended the metafictional aspects of the game. Walker claimed that "It does stuff with my PC that I didn't know games could do". Charlie Nicholson praised the way it disrupted the barrier between the player and the game, stating that he was tempted "to resort to blue-tacking [his] webcam". Adventure Gamers reviewer Pascal Teikala also praised these interactions, but noted that some players might dislike its interference with their computer. Stowe criticised the game's puzzle design, but conceded that his difficulties only applied to a few puzzles.

Hardcore Gamer reviewer Spencer Rutledge praised the game's story, stating that "OneShot effortlessly conveys emotion". Walker stated that its cast "nearly always contain[s] a moment that will make you smile". Both Nicholson and Stowe commended the characterisation of Niko; the latter claiming that whilst playing the game, he genuinely wanted to help them. Opposingly, Nicholson claimed it did not have depth compared to other metafictional games, deeming its cast "lacking" and too distant from Niko, and Teikala thought that the alien feel of the game made it difficult to relate to. GameGrins Ben Robson criticised the full version of the game for forgoing the "one-shot" nature of the freeware version, claiming that the ability to play the game multiple times took away from its themes.

The art direction was largely positively received. Comparing it to what he perceived as Undertale'''s poorly-defined art style, Robson called it "clearly defined", and a good complement to the game's mysterious environment. Nicholson and Rutledge also commended the art, with the former praising the way which it reflected the solemn tone of the story. Although he found the thematic colouration was interesting, Teikala claimed the overall direction was too "modest", with many of the game's environments being unnecessarily simple.

Rutledge stated that the game's soundtrack "almost seems like a dream at times", with the music perfectly matching each area of the game. COGConnecteds Stowe thought that the music made "exploring the game... a treat". Robson was more negative; though not criticising it, he stated that it failed to live up to the visuals.

In 2017, OneShot'' was nominated for the "PC Game of the Year" category of the Golden Joystick Awards.

Notes

References

External links 
 Official website

2016 video games
Adventure games
Indie video games
Linux games
MacOS games
Metafictional video games
Nintendo Switch games
PlayStation 4 games
Puzzle video games
RPG Maker games
Video games about cats
Video games with alternate endings
Windows games
Xbox One games